Ellen DeVoe is a professor in the Clinical Practice Department at the Boston University School of Social Work and founding director of the Trauma Certificate Program.  From 2013 to 2019, DeVoe was the director of the Interdisciplinary PhD Program in Sociology & Social Work, PhD Program in Social Work.

Education
BA (social history and women's studies), Princeton University, 1986
MSW (clinical social work and mental health), University of Denver, 1990
PhD (social work and psychology), University of Michigan, 1996
NIMH postdoctoral fellowship (family violence research training), University of New Hampshire

Career
DeVoe has taught at the Columbia University School of Social Work, University of New Hampshire's College of Lifelong Learning in Portsmouth, New Hampshire, Eastern Michigan University, and the University of Michigan School of Social Work.

DeVoe was the principal investigator for Strong Families Strong Forces (SFSF), a four year program for which BUSSW received a "grant from the U.S. Department of Defense to fund a program that would help support the healthy reintegration of soldiers from Operation Enduring Freedom/Operation Iraqi Freedom into their families."

References

Boston University faculty
Princeton University alumni
University of Denver alumni
University of Michigan School of Social Work alumni
Social work scholars
Living people
Columbia University School of Social Work faculty
Eastern Michigan University faculty
University of Michigan faculty
Year of birth missing (living people)